Howard Eisenberg (born 26 August 1926) is an American author and journalist best known for his contributions to biography, self-help and children's literature. A magazine journalist since the early 1950s and recent playwright, as well as a member of the American Society of Journalists and Authors (ASJA).

Eisenberg has written many articles—often with his late wife, Arlene Eisenberg— for national publications. Additionally he's written six adult books, four co-authored with his wife Arlene, three Guess Who books for children, and scripts for radio and TV.

Eisenberg's wife, Arlene Eisenberg co-authored the original What To Expect When You're Expecting, a pregnancy guide for expecting parents, with Heidi Murkoff.  The Arlene Awards were created by Howard Eisenberg for the American Society of Journalists and Authors, to honor his late wife Arlene Eisenberg.   The fund provides awards for bestselling books and magazine articles that make a documented difference.

Awards
 In 1965, the Eisenbergs won the Gold Medal by the National Council of Christian and Jews, for the Look Magazine cover story: "The Christian War on Anti-Semitism"
 In 2015, Eisenberg won the Outstanding Book of 2015 Award in the Service and Self-Help category by the American Society of Journalists and Authors for The Recovery Book.

Bibliography authored by Howard Eisenberg

Children's Books
 Adorable Scoundrels (Mascot) 2016

Series
 Guess Who Zoo (Mascot) 2013 
 Guess Who Farm (Mascot) 2013 
 Guess Who Neighborhood (Mascot) 2013

Adult Books         
 It's Never Too Late to Date (iUniverse) -- 2009
 The Recovery Book (Workman) -- 1992, 2014
 A Funny Thing Happened on the Way to Cooperstown (Triumph) -- 2003                  
 Night Calls: The Personal Journey of an Ob/Gyn (Arbor House) -- 1986                
 Alive and Well: Decisions in Health (McGraw-Hill) -- 1979
 How to be Your Own Lawyer (Sometimes) (Putnam) -- 1979       
 How to be Your Own Doctor (Sometimes) (Grosset & Dunlap) -- 1975

Musicals
 The Guess Who Zoo 1995 
 The Million Dollar Bet 2015
 Adorable Scoundrels 2016, a mini-musical

Magazines
 Saturday Evening Post
 New York Times Magazine
 Sports Illustrated
 Reader's Digest
 Cosmopolitan
 Parade
 Ladies Home Journal
 Good Housekeeping
 McCall's
 Many others

References

External links
 Howard Eisenberg's Official LinkedIn

1926 births
Living people
American male journalists
University of Miami alumni